Sven Holm (13 April 1940 – 11 May 2019) was a Danish author and playwright. Holm graduated from Herlufsholm School in 1958. His first short story collection, Den store fjende, was published in 1961. In 1974, Holm was awarded the Grand Prize of the Danish Academy. He was awarded the Holberg Medal in 1991. In 2001, Holm was made a member of the Danish Academy. That same year, he was awarded the Danish Critics Prize for Literature for his short story collection Kanten af himlen.

Selected works

Prose 

 Den store fjende (The great enemy), short story collection, 1961
Nedstyrtningen (The Crash), short story collection, 1963
 Kanten af himlen (The edge of the sky), short story collection, 2001

Drama 
Syg og munter (Sick and cheerful)
Den anden side af Krista X (The other side of Krista X)
Hr. Henrys begravelse og andre fortællinger (Sir. Henry's funeral and other tales)
 Struensee var her (Struensee was here), 1977
 Schumanns Nat, 2002

References 

1940 births
2019 deaths
20th-century Danish male writers
21st-century Danish male writers
20th-century Danish dramatists and playwrights
21st-century Danish dramatists and playwrights
20th-century Danish short story writers
21st-century Danish short story writers